Tirazabad (also Romanized as Ţīrazābād; also known as Ţarīzābād, Terīzābād, Tīrīzābād, and Tirjābād) is a village in Rudbar Rural District, in the Central District of Tafresh County, Markazi Province, Iran. At the 2006 census, its population was 63, in 14 families.

References 

Populated places in Tafresh County